Jonquière-Kénogami was a former provincial electoral district in the Saguenay–Lac-Saint-Jean region of  Quebec, Canada that elected members to the Legislative Assembly of Quebec.

It was created for the 1956 election, from parts of the existing Chicoutimi and Lac-Saint-Jean electoral districts.  Its final election was in 1962.  It disappeared in the 1966 election and its successor electoral district was Jonquière.

Members of the Legislative Assembly
Léonce Ouellet, Union Nationale (1956–1960)
Gérald Harvey, Liberal (1960–1966) (Was re-elected in Jonquière in 1966)

Election history

External links
Election results
 Election results (National Assembly)
 Election results (Quebecpolitique.com)

Former provincial electoral districts of Quebec